Meadows Farm Complex is a historic home and farm complex located at Cazenovia in Madison County, New York.  The Meadows farmhouse was built about 1900 and is a -story, L-shaped frame residence with restrained Queen Anne–style detailing. The Meadows guesthouse was built about 1815  in a rural vernacular Federal style.  Also on the property are two barns, shed, smokehouse, well, and machine shed.

It was added to the National Register of Historic Places in 1987.

References

Houses on the National Register of Historic Places in New York (state)
Queen Anne architecture in New York (state)
Federal architecture in New York (state)
Houses completed in 1815
Houses in Madison County, New York
National Register of Historic Places in Cazenovia, New York